David James Stratton  (born 10 September 1939) is an English-Australian award-winning film critic, as both a journalist and interviewer, film historian and lecturer and television personality and producer.

Life and career
Born in Trowbridge, Wiltshire, England, in 1939, Stratton was sent to Hampshire to see out the war years with his grandmother, an avid filmgoer, where he was taken to the local cinemas regularly and saw a diverse range of movies. He attended Chafyn Grove School from 1948 to 1953 as a boarder. He saw his first foreign film at Bath in 1955—Italian romantic comedy Bread, Love and Dreams. That was soon followed by Akira Kurosawa's Japanese adventure drama classic Seven Samurai tracked down in Birmingham. At the age of 19, he founded the Melksham and District Film Society. David arrived in Australia in 1963, and soon became involved with the local film society movement. He directed the Sydney Film Festival from 1966 until 1983. At the time, he was the subject of surveillance by the Australian Security Intelligence Organisation, due to the festival showing Soviet films and his late-1960s visit to Russia. This information was not made public until January 2014.

A highly regarded expert on international cinema, particularly French cinema, Stratton was President of FIPRESCI (International Film Critics) Juries in Cannes (twice) and Venice. He was also a member of the jury at the 32nd Berlin International Film Festival in 1982.

Stratton worked for SBS from 1980, acting as their film consultant and introducing the SBS Cinema Classic and Movie of the Week for 24 weeks a year. From 1986 onwards Stratton co-hosted the long-running SBS TV program The Movie Show with Margaret Pomeranz, who was also the show's original producer. Stratton and Pomeranz left SBS in 2004. From 2004 Stratton and Pomeranz co-hosted the ABC film show, At the Movies. On 16 September 2014, Stratton and Pomeranz announced that they would be retiring at the end of the 2014 series. The ABC confirmed that the series would end, with the last episode broadcast on 9 December 2014.

He currently writes reviews for The Australian newspaper and formerly did so for the US film industry magazine Variety. He also does film reviews for TV Week, where he has been for a number of years. He lectures in film history at the University of Sydney's Centre for Continuing Education. In 2008 he released his autobiography called I Peed on Fellini, a reference to a drunken attempt to shake director Federico Fellini's hand while using a urinal.

Stratton participated in the 2012 Sight & Sound critics' poll, where he listed his ten favorite films as follows: Charulata, Citizen Kane, The Conversation, Distant, Distant Voices, Still Lives, Kings of the Road, Lola, The Searchers, Singin' in the Rain, and The Travelling Players.

Stratton and Margaret Pomeranz have played an important role in challenging the often heavy-handed decisions of the Australian Classification Board throughout their career.

The documentary film David Stratton: A Cinematic Life, written and directed by Sally Aitken, was released in 2017, and re-edited for television, featuring interviews with Stratton about his life and with actors, directors, producers representing Australian cinema since the 1960s. A preliminary version of the film was first released at the 2016 Adelaide Film Festival as David Stratton's Stories of Australian Cinema, a "work in progress screening... a celebration of 110 years of Australian Cinema history and its creators".

Other appearances
 In 1995 Stratton made an uncredited cameo in Touch Me, one of the short films featured in Zieglerfilm's series Erotic Tales
 Stratton has also appeared in several ABC programs including The Chaser's War on Everything, Review with Myles Barlow, Good Game, Adam Hills in Gordon Street Tonight, Lawrence Leung's Choose Your Own Adventure and The Bazura Project, often parodying himself
 On Saturday 14 March 2015 Stratton appeared in a meeting with David Lynch in 'David Lynch: Between Two Worlds', 14 March – 8 June 2015, at the Gallery of Modern Art (GOMA) in Brisbane, Queensland

Honours
 On 1 January 2001 Stratton was awarded the Centenary Medal for "Service to Australian society and Australian film production".
 On 22 March 2001 he was appointed with the Croix de Commandeur of the Ordre des Arts et des Lettres (Order of Arts and Literature), the highest rank for this award, for his services to cinema, in particular French cinema.
 In 2001 he received the Australian Film Institute's Longford Life Achievement Award.
 On 9 June 2006 Stratton received an honorary degree of Doctor of Letters from the University of Sydney in recognition of his career and his contribution to intellectual life at the university.
 In 2007, he received the 60th Anniversary Medal by the Festival du Film de Cannes and The Chauvel Award by the Brisbane International Film Festival.
 Stratton became a Member of the Order of Australia in the 2015 Australia Day honours.

Publications

References

External links
Honorary doctorate presentation
Official biography
ABC Radio biography
Quickflix biography

1939 births
Living people
Australian film critics
Film festival directors
Australian media personalities
Australian memoirists
The Australian journalists
English emigrants to Australia
People educated at Chafyn Grove School
Journalists from Sydney
People from Trowbridge
Members of the Order of Australia
Recipients of the Centenary Medal
Commandeurs of the Ordre des Arts et des Lettres
Variety (magazine) people